Mebaireek is a settlement in Qatar, located in the municipality of Al Rayyan.  It was formalized as one of Al Rayyan's ten administrative zones in the mid-2000s as a result of a merger between the two census-designated districts of Abu Nakhla and Al Mukaynis. Al Mukaynis, which is known for Mudhlem Cave, is still in Zone 81 with Mebaireek whereas Abu Nakhla has moved to Al-Shahaniya Municipality.

Etymology
"Mebaireek" originates from the Arabic name "Mubarak", and was named in honor of an esteemed resident who went by that name.

Transport
Major roads that run through the district are Salwa Road and Mesaieed Road.

Education
The following school is located in Mebaireek:

References

Populated places in Al Rayyan